The 2021–22 season is the 101st season in the existence of C.D. Santa Clara and the club's third consecutive season in the top flight of Portuguese football. In addition to the domestic league, Santa Clara will participate in this season's edition of the Taça de Portugal, Taça da Liga, and the UEFA Europa Conference League.

Players

First-team squad

Out on loan

Transfers

Pre-season and friendlies

Competitions

Overall record

Primeira Liga

League table

Results summary

Results by round

Matches

Taça de Portugal

Taça da Liga

UEFA Europa Conference League

Second qualifying round
The draw for the second qualifying round was held on 16 June 2021.

Third qualifying round
The draw for the third qualifying round was held on 19 July 2021.

Play-off round
The draw for the play-off round was held on 2 August 2021.

Notes

References

C.D. Santa Clara seasons
Santa Clara
Santa Clara